Anastasios "Tasos" Gousis (born 7 July 1979) is a Greek sprint athlete.

He was born in Corfu.

He competed in the 200 m and 400 m in the 2000 Olympics, but did not progress further from the heats in either event. At the 2004 Olympics he made the semi-finals in the 200 m and competed for Greece in the 4 × 400 m relay.

He finished eighth in the 200 m final at the 2006 European Athletics Championships and at the 2007 World Championships.

He was tested positive for methyltrienolone in his A-sample on 4 August 2008, before the 2008 Summer Olympics, and was called back to Greece, pending the results of his B-sample. He received an IAAF suspension from August 2008 to August 2010.

Honours

References

1979 births
Living people
Greek male sprinters
Olympic athletes of Greece
Athletes (track and field) at the 2000 Summer Olympics
Athletes (track and field) at the 2004 Summer Olympics
Sportspeople from Corfu
World Athletics Championships athletes for Greece
Doping cases in athletics
Greek sportspeople in doping cases
21st-century Greek people